Danya Abrams (born September 24, 1974) is a former basketball player who played for the Boston College Eagles during his time in the NCAA. He played professionally in Spain for Malaga, Sevilla, and Granada while in Greece for Apallon, Maroussi, and AEP Petras. He is from Greenburgh, New York. He starred with the Eagles from 1993 to 1997, getting selected first-team all Big East Conference three times. Abrams finished his collegiate career with 2,053 points in 122 games.

In 1997, with the help of sophomore point guard Scoonie Penn, Abrams and Boston College won the Big East men's basketball tournament, before beating Valparaiso in the first round of the 1997 NCAA Tournament that year. In the second round, they went on to lose to Saint Joseph's 81–77 in overtime on March 15 in Salt Lake City.

After college he continued his basketball career, becoming a professional in Puerto Rico with the Baloncesto Superior Nacional's Santeros de Aguada, Spain, then later Greece, continuing to play the center and power forward positions until 2009, averaging over 14 points and six rebounds per game during his career.

In July 2011, Abrams was named assistant coach of the men's basketball program at Wentworth Institute of Technology, a Division III school in Boston, Massachusetts that competes in the Commonwealth Coast Conference.  Wentworth's head coach is Tom Devitt, who was an assistant coach on Head Coach Jim O'Brien's Boston College staff during Abrams' career.  Abrams lives in Avon, Massachusetts with his wife Deanna, and their children Tatyana, Danya Jr., and Christian.

See also
List of NCAA Division I men's basketball players with 2000 points and 1000 rebounds

References

Boston.com article on Danya Abrams

External links 

 Realgm Profile

1974 births
Living people
American expatriate basketball people in Greece
American expatriate basketball people in Spain
American men's basketball players
Apollon Patras B.C. players
Baloncesto Málaga players
Baloncesto Superior Nacional players
Boston College Eagles men's basketball players
Basketball players from New York (state)
CB Girona players
CB Granada players
Real Betis Baloncesto players
Centers (basketball)
Connecticut Pride players
Liga ACB players
Maroussi B.C. players
People from Greenburgh, New York
Power forwards (basketball)
Santeros de Aguada basketball players
Sportspeople from Westchester County, New York